The Wairoa River is located in the north of the South Island of New Zealand. It flows north for 45 kilometres before combining with the Wai-iti River to form the Waimea River. This flows into the southern end of Tasman Bay / Te Tai-o-Aorere near Richmond.

Rivers of the Tasman District
Rivers of New Zealand